{{DISPLAYTITLE:C18H21NO6}}
The molecular formula C18H21NO6 (molar mass: 347.36 g/mol, exact mass: 347.1369 u) may refer to:

 Evoxine (haploperine)
 Naproxcinod (nitronaproxen)

Molecular formulas